GENESIS is a project maintained by the Women's Library at London Metropolitan University.  It provides an online database and a list of sources with an intent to support research into women's history.

Database 

The database consists of descriptions of women's history collections from sources in the UK.

Guide to Sources 

The project also provides a Guide to Sources to a large array of websites relating to women's history—both within the UK and internationally.

References 
GENESIS project information page

External links 
GENESIS homepage 

Bibliographic databases and indexes
Organisations based in London
History of women in the United Kingdom
London Metropolitan University